Nothobranchius rubripinnis is a species of killifish in the family Nothobranchiidae. It is endemic to Tanzania.  Its natural habitats are rivers and rice fields.

References

rubripinnis
Endemic freshwater fish of Tanzania
Fish described in 1986
Taxa named by Lothar Seegers
Taxonomy articles created by Polbot